The 1998 Michigan Wolverines football team represented the University of Michigan in the 1998 NCAA Division I-A football season.  The team's head coach was Lloyd Carr.  The Wolverines played their home games at Michigan Stadium.  The 1998 Wolverines finished the season with a 10–3 record (7–1 in the Big Ten) and defeated the Arkansas Razorbacks in the 1999 Florida Citrus Bowl.  The team was ranked #12 in both the coaches and AP polls.

This Michigan team was the last defending national champion in FBS football to lose their opening game until 2020.

Schedule

Rankings

Roster

Season summary

at Notre Dame

Syracuse

Eastern Michigan

Michigan State

at Iowa

at Northwestern

Indiana

at Minnesota

Penn State

Wisconsin

at Ohio State

at Hawaii

Florida Citrus Bowl (vs Arkansas)

Statistical achievements
The team earned the second consecutive Big Ten passing defense statistical championships for all games by holding opponents to 181.2 yards per game as well as the second consecutive championship for conference games by holding conference opponents to 139.2 yards per game. They also ranked first in passing efficiency defense for both all games (49.9), while Ohio State led for conference games.  The team led the conference in total defense for conference games (244.6), while Ohio State led for all games.

On November 21 against Ohio State, Tom Brady established the current Michigan record for single-game pass attempts (56), surpassing Scott Dreisbach's 52 set in 1995.  In the same game, he surpassed Todd Collins' single-game pass completions record of 29 with 31, a record he would go on to surpass himself later in his career. That day, he also established the single-game passing yards record (375), surpassing Dreisbach's 372 set in 1995 with a record that would be broken by John Navarre in 2003.  Brady set several other records: single-season pass attempts record (350), surpassing Brian Griese's 307 set in 1997 and broken by Navarre in 2001; single-season completions (214), surpassing Griese's 193 set in 1997 and tied by himself the following season and broken by Navarre in 2002. He tied 1986 Jim Harbaugh's single-season 200-yard game output of 8, a record broken by Navarre in 2002.

Draft
The following players were selected in the 1999 NFL Draft:
Jon Jansen
Jerame Tuman
Tai Streets
Andre Weathers

Awards and honors
The individuals in the sections below earned recognition for meritorious performances.

National
All-Americans: Jon Jansen
Academic All-American: Jansen, Rob Renes (second team)

Conference

All-Conference: Steve Hutchinson, Jerame Tuman, Jon Jansen
Big Ten Offensive Lineman of the Year: Jansen

Team
Co-captains: Jon Jansen, Juaquin Feazell, Marcus Ray
Most Valuable Player: Tai Streets
Meyer Morton Award: Tai Streets
John Maulbetsch Award: Maurice Williams
Frederick Matthei Award: Dhani Jones
Arthur Robinson Scholarship Award: Rob Renes
Dick Katcher Award: Rob Renes
Hugh Rader Jr. Award: Jon Jansen
Robert P. Ufer Award: Mark Campbell
Roger Zatkoff Award: Sam Sword

Coaching staff
Head coach: Lloyd Carr
Assistant coaches: Teryl Austin, Erik Campbell, Mike DeBord, Jim Herrmann, Brady Hoke, Fred Jackson, Terry Malone, Bobby Morrison, Stan Parrish
Staff: Scott Draper, Mark Ouimet, Kelly Cox
Trainer: Paul Schmidt
Managers: Adam Clous, Dave Eklund, Joe Grelewicz, Sean Merrill, Sara Rontal

References

External links
  1998 Football Team -- Bentley Historical Library, University of Michigan Athletics History

Michigan
Michigan Wolverines football seasons
Big Ten Conference football champion seasons
Citrus Bowl champion seasons
Michigan Wolverines football